"Only a Lonely Heart Sees" is a song by American singer-songwriter Felix Cavaliere, released as a single in 1980. It is from his 1979 album Castles in the Air.

The song is Cavaliere's only top 40 hit on the Billboard Hot 100, peaking at No. 36. It is also his only top 5 hit on the Adult Contemporary chart, peaking at No. 2.

Chart performance

See also
List of one-hit wonders in the United States

References

1979 songs
1980 singles
American soft rock songs
Epic Records singles